Kathryn C. Lee (1935–2013) was an American newspaper publisher who helped found the first African American newspaper, The Sacramento Observer, in Sacramento, California in 1962.

Early life and education 
She attended San Francisco State University. In 1962, she married William H. Lee and they purchased the newspaper, which was then called The Sacramento Outlook.

Career 

Lee was the first African American to work at the Sacramento County Sheriff in 1956 and the first African American to serve on the Sacramento Grand Jury in 1973. She later worked full time as assistant publisher at The Sacramento Observer and ultimately ran the newspaper's finances. When one of the paper's co-founders died and a business partner left in 1965, the couple ran the paper themselves and kept it from folding.

Since it started as a four-page newspaper, it has grown into a leading Black newspaper in the country, honored by the National Newspaper Publishers Association and called the "main source of news for Sacramento's Black communities."

Awards and honors 
Lee won many honors including:
 1970 Woman of the Year by the Women's Civic Improvement Club of Sacramento
 1991 Greyhound Corporation’s Woman of the Year
 1993 National Council of Negro of Women, Sacramento Valley Section’s “Most Outstanding Women” award
 1999 recipient of the Second Annual Madame CJ Walker Entrepreneurial Award
 2002 Pioneer Award National Coalition of 100 Black Women, Sacramento Chapter
 2002 Partnership Service Award from Links, Inc.

Death and legacy 
Lee died on March 25, 2013 at her home in Oak Park, California. One of her children, Larry Lee, is now publisher of The Sacramento Observer.

References 

Created via preloaddraft
1935 births
2013 deaths
African-American women
American newspaper publishers (people)
African-American publishers (people)
San Francisco State University alumni